The 1920 The Citadel Bulldogs football team represented The Citadel, The Military College of South Carolina in the 1920 college football season. Harry J. O'Brien returned to lead the Bulldogs after a one-year absence. His second tenure as head coach would last two seasons. The Bulldogs played as members of the Southern Intercollegiate Athletic Association and played home games at College Park Stadium in Hampton Park.

Schedule

References

Citadel
The Citadel Bulldogs football seasons
Citadel Bulldogs football